Deadlock is a 2021 American action thriller film directed by Jared Cohn, starring Patrick Muldoon and Bruce Willis. It was released in the United States on December 3, 2021, by Saban Films.

Synopsis
Wanted criminal Ron Whitlock leads a team of mercenaries on a mission of vengeance. Convinced that the local detectives are responsible for the death of one of his sons and the wrongful imprisonment of the other one for a botched drug bust, the merciless group brutally seizes a hydroelectric dam and holds everyone inside hostage. With a nearby town on the brink of massive flooding and destruction, it's up to a retired Army Green Beret Mack Karr to save thousands of innocent lives before it's too late.

Cast
 Bruce Willis as Ron Whitlock
 Patrick Muldoon as Mack Karr
 Matthew Marsden as Boone
 Michael DeVorzon as Smith
 Stephen Sepher as Gator
 Ava Paloma as Sophia
 Christopher Cleveland as Detective Lincoln Fulbright
 Kelcey Rose Weimer as Paula Fulbright
 Douglas Matthews as Tommy Blaylock
 Kelly Reiter as Amy Rakestraw
 Johnny Messner as Cranbrook
 Billy Jack Harlow as Decker
 Shep Dunn as Henchman Slim

Production
Filming wrapped in Georgia in February 2021.

Release
Saban Films acquired North American and UK rights to the film in June 2020.

Box office
As of November 11, 2022, Deadlock grossed $12,473 in Portugal and South Korea.

Accolades
Bruce Willis was nominated for his performance in this movie, as he was for all movies he appeared in, in 2021, in the category Worst Performance by Bruce Willis in a 2021 Movie at the Golden Raspberry Awards. The category was later rescinded after he announced his retirement due to aphasia.

References

External links
 
 

2021 action thriller films
2021 independent films
American action thriller films
Saban Films films
2020s English-language films
Films directed by Jared Cohn
2020s American films